Kam Ping is one of the 35 constituencies in the Eastern District, Hong Kong. The constituency returns one district councillor to the Eastern District Council, with an election every four years.

Kam Ping constituency is loosely based on the area in North Point nearby the Kam Ping Street with large presence of Hokkien population of an estimated population of 16,085.

Councillors represented

Election results

2010s

2000s

1990s

References

North Point
Constituencies of Hong Kong
Constituencies of Eastern District Council
1994 establishments in Hong Kong
Constituencies established in 1994